The 1973 Union Trust Classic, also known as the Washington Indoor, was a men's tennis tournament played on indoor carpet courts in Merrifield, Virginia in the United States that was part of Group B of the 1973 World Championship Tennis circuit. It was the second edition of the tournament and was held  from March 19 through March 25, 1973. Unseeded Tom Okker won the singles title and earned $10,000 first-prize money after his opponent in the final, Arthur Ashe, failed to convert two matchpoints in the final set.

Finals

Singles
 Tom Okker defeated  Arthur Ashe 6–3, 6–7(4–7), 7–6(7–3)
 It was Okker's 1st singles title of the year and the 28th of his career.

Doubles
 Tom Okker /  Marty Riessen defeated  Arthur Ashe /  Roscoe Tanner 4–6, 7–6, 6–2

See also
 1973 Washington Star International

References

External links
 ITF tournament edition details

Equity Funding International
Equity Funding International
Equity Funding International
1973 in sports in Washington, D.C.